The Minister of Trade ( in New Zealand is a senior Minister within the New Zealand Government appointed by the Prime Minister. The current Minister of Trade is Damien O'Connor.

List of ministers
The following ministers have held the office of Minister of Trade.

Key

Notes

References

External links
New Zealand Ministry of Foreign Affairs and Trade

Trade
Political office-holders in New Zealand